Colthrop is a suburb of the town of Thatcham in the English county of Berkshire, England.

Geography
Colthrop is part of the civil parish of Thatcham. The settlement lies on the A4 road, and is the location of numerous industrial parks and haulage depots due to the area's proximity to Thatcham railway station. The industrial area was previously the site of the Colthrop paper mills.

Motor Insurers' Automotive Research Centre
The motor insurers’ automotive research centre was established by the UK motor insurance industry in 1969. Its aim is to reduce or contain the cost of motor insurance claims in the UK whilst maintaining safety standards. It is based at Colthrop in Thatcham. The 'Thatcham categories' issued by the centre for vehicle immobilisers and alarms have become an industry standard since their launch in the 1990s.

References

External links

Thatcham
Villages in Berkshire
West Berkshire District